Ryan Rozicki is a Canadian professional boxer who challenged for the WBC bridgerweight title in 2021.

Career
Rozicki started boxing at the age of 15. He made his professional debut on October 15, 2016, defeating Donald Willis via third-round technical knockout (TKO) at the Aitken Centre in Fredericton, New Brunswick and in June of 2018 signed with Three Lions Promotions. He won the CPBC North American cruiserweight title in 2017, stopping journeyman Álvaro Enriquez in the second round to move to 5–0. Rozicki knocked out the previously undefeated Abokan Bokpe on October 20, 2018 for the vacant WBA-NABA Canada cruiserweight title. On 18 May 2019, Rozicki defeated American Shawn Miller via third-round KO for the vacant WBC International Silver cruiserweight title in Sydney, Nova Scotia.

In October 2021, Rozicki was announced as Óscar Rivas's opponent for the inaugural WBC bridgerweight title in Montreal, replacing Bryant Jennings due to issues regarding Canada's COVID-19 quarantine policy.

Rozicki fought Yamil "Jara" Peralta for the WBC international cruiserweight title in front of a hometown crowd at Sydney, Nova Scotia's Centre 200 on May 7, 2022. Rozicki made headlines by acknowledging his opponent had won the boxing match through a statement on live network TV, directly after the decision was announced. Rozicki was initially awarded in a controversial split decision. The day after the title fight, the WBC nullified the victory and declared the title vacant. In explaining its decision, the WBC said that the official report from the supervisor they had assigned to the event stated that Peralta had in fact won the fight and that the local judges had incorrectly awarded the title to Rozicki. According to the report, all four ring officials present during the fight had been appointed by the local boxing authority, a matter that had been strongly objected to prior to the fight. In the aftermath, the WBC appointed a panel of officials to review the fight and it was unanimously determined that Peralta should have been awarded the title. Host of the show and Rozicki’s promoter Daniel Otter, respected the decision of the WBC and the duo’s sportsmanship was recognized and appreciated from the WBC, shown through a statement made from the organizations president, Mauricio Sulaiman’.

Personal life
In March 2020, Ryan Rozicki was charged with offences following a domestic disturbance. In January 2021, Rozicki pleaded guilty to charges of assault and mischief relating to property damage.

Professional boxing record

References

External links
 

Living people
Date of birth missing (living people)
Year of birth missing (living people)
Canadian male boxers
Cruiserweight boxers
Sportspeople from the Cape Breton Regional Municipality
Bridgerweight boxers